Josemar Sobreiro de Oliveira (born April 12, 1954) is a Brazilian civil police, teacher and politician. In 2012 he was elected mayor of Paço do Lumiar for the term of 20132016, affiliated with the Liberal Party (PL). In September 2015 he changed his affiliation to the Brazilian Social Democracy Party. Sobreiro ran for reelection in 2016, but did not succeed.

References 

Living people
1954 births
People from Maranhão
Mayors of places in Brazil
Brazilian Social Democracy Party politicians
Liberal Party (Brazil, 2006) politicians
Democratic Social Party politicians
Progressistas politicians